Manuel Philes (c. 1275–1345), of Ephesus, Byzantine poet.

Biography
At an early age, he moved to Constantinople, where he was the pupil of Georgius Pachymeres, in whose honour he composed a memorial poem. Philes appears to have travelled extensively, and his writings contain much information concerning the imperial court and distinguished Byzantines. He participated in an embassy to the "Tauroscythians" (Tatars) in 1293 to arrange the marriage of Maria, daughter of Andronikos II Palaiologos, to Toqta, the khan of the Golden Horde. He then was on a mission to recruit Georgian archers in 1305 and 1306. Having offended one of the emperors, probably Andronikos II, by indiscreet remarks published in a chronography, he was briefly thrown into prison and only released after an abject apology. 

Philes is the counterpart of Theodorus Prodromus in the time of the Comneni; his character, as shown in his poems, is that of a begging poet, always pleading poverty, and ready to descend to the grossest flattery to obtain the favorable notice of the great. With one unimportant exception, his productions are in verse, the greater part in dodecasyllabic iambic trimeters, the remainder in the fifteen-syllable "political" measure.

Philes was the author of poems on a great variety of subjects: on the characteristics of animals, chiefly based upon Aelian and Oppian, a didactic poem of some 2000 lines, dedicated to Michael IX Palaiologos; on the elephant; on plants; a necrological poem, probably written on the death of one of the sons of the imperial house; a panegyric on John VI Kantakouzenos, in the form of a dialogue; a conversation between a man and his soul; on ecclesiastical subjects, such as church festivals, Christian beliefs, the saints and fathers of the church; on works of art, perhaps the most valuable of all his pieces for their bearing on Byzantine iconography, since the writer had before him the works he describes, and also the most successful from a literary point of view; occasional poems, many of which are simply begging letters in verse.

References 

Attribution:
 |Endnotes
  —See the natural history poems
 
 
 

1275 births
1345 deaths
Byzantine poets
14th-century Byzantine writers
14th-century Byzantine people
Manuel
Ephesus
14th-century poets
Occasional poets